Team Rynkeby is a Nordic charity cycling team that travels from Denmark to Paris by bike. The purpose of this trip is to raise money for the Child Cancer Foundation in Denmark, Sweden, Finland, Norway, Germany and Switzerland.
Team Rynkeby was founded in 2002 by the employees of the Danish juice company Rynkeby Foods A/S. Rynkeby Foods is the leading Danish manufacturer of fruit juices and other fruit-based food items and the company is the main sponsor of the team.

In 2012, Team Rynkeby consists of 790 riders and 170 assistants divided between 13 Danish and four Swedish teams. The Danish teams raise money for the Children's Cancer Foundation in Denmark, while the Swedish teams raise money for Child Cancer Foundation in Sweden.

The participants of Team Rynkeby are both male and female, between all ages and with various jobs, educations and backgrounds. The participants' diversity and their geographical dispersion in Denmark and Sweden make it easier for Team Rynkeby to disseminate about the charity project for the benefit of children with cancer and the children’s families.

In 2011, Team Rynkeby raised 9.772 million DDK (1.315 million EUR) to the fight against childhood cancer.

Team Rynkeby's donations to the Child Cancer Foundation

 2002: 38.000 DKK /5.111 EUR (11 riders)
 2003: 100.000 DKK /13.450 EUR (15 riders)
 2004: 172.800 DKK /23.242 EUR (15 riders)
 2005: 174.300 DKK /23.444 EUR (21 riders)
 2006: 243.400 DKK /32.739 EUR (21 riders)
 2007: 450.000 DKK /60.527 EUR (41 riders)
 2008: 1.450.000 DKK /195.032 EUR (155 riders on 4 Danish teams)
 2009: 3.054.000 DKK /410.779 EUR (273 riders on 7 Danish teams)
 2010: 4.720.000 DKK /634.865 EUR (311 riders on 8 Danish teams)
 2011: 9.722.000 DKK /1.315 mio. EUR (584 riders on 11 Danish and two Swedish teams)

The seven stages
The riders bike seven stages throughout Denmark, Germany, the Netherlands, Belgium and France. Four of the stages are around 200 km. The route changes every year, and the teams are not going exactly the same route during the tour. This is the route from 2011:
 Prologue: 10–220 km (Friday)
 1.stage: 160 km Ringe (DK) - Rendsburg (D) (Saturday)
 2. stage: 180 km Rendsburg (D) - Farge (D) (Sunday)
 3. stage: 190 km Farge (D) - Boekelo (NL) (Monday)
 4. stage: 200 km Boekelo (NL) - Hasselt (B) (Tuesday)
 5. stage: 110 km Hasselt (B) - Dinant (B) (Wednesday)
 6. stage: 180 km Dinant (B) - Soissons (F) (Thursday)
 7. stage: 110 km Soissons (F) - Paris (F) (Friday)

External links
 Team-rynkeby.dk
 Bornecancerfonden.dk

References 

Charity events